Trumped may refer to:
 Trumped!, a talk radio program with Donald Trump, 2004 – 2008
 Trumped! (book), a 1991 book about Donald Trump 
 Trumped (2009 film), a short thriller film by Michael Whitton
 Trumped (2017 film), a documentary film about Donald Trump
 Trumped (Jimmy Kimmel Live!), a 2016 satirical short film by Nathan Lane and Matthew Broderick

See also
 You've Been Trumped, a 2011 documentary film
 Trump (disambiguation)